A with diaeresis may refer to:
 
A with diaeresis (Cyrillic), a conventional name of letter Ӓ, ä from several Cyrillic alphabets: Gagauz, Khanty, Kildin Sami and Western Mari
Ä, known as A with diaeresis or A with umlaut, a letter Ä, ä of Latin-based German, Estonian, Finnish, Slovak, Swedish, Romani and Turkmen alphabets